Jadoo is a food-feud family comedy feature film set in Leicester, released in cinemas on 6 September 2013. It is written and directed by filmmaker Amit Gupta. It tells the story of two brothers, Raja and Jagi, who are both chefs, but fall out catastrophically. They set up rival restaurants, on opposite sides of Belgrave Road in Leicester; one cooking starters and the other main courses, and refuse to talk to one another. Raja's daughter Shalini, attempts to get the brothers talking again. She hatches a plan and asks them to work together to cook her a perfect Indian wedding banquet.

Plot
Two brothers, both wonderful chefs, fall out catastrophically. At the climax of their dispute they rip the family recipe book in half – one brother gets the starters and the other gets the main courses. They set up rival restaurants, on opposite sides of the same road, and spend the next twenty years trying to outdo each other. Neither brother will admit it but they both know they are not entirely successful without the ‘other half’ of the menu. It takes Raja's daughter, Shalini, a successful London lawyer, marrying a man from a different ethnic background, to reunite them. She is planning her marriage and is determined that they will both attend. Can the men bury the hatchet without actually burying the kitchen knife?
Shalini returns home to Leicester for the Hindu festival of Holi to tell her father and her uncle that she's getting married. But it takes a challenge from a sharp ambitious new restaurant owner who tries to put them out of business and a threat from Shalini that she will not have a traditional Indian wedding before the brothers finally start to unravel the secret behind the quarrel which has lasted two decades.

Cast
Amara Karan as Shalini
Harish Patel as Raja
Kulvinder Ghir as Jagi
Tom Mison as Mark
Ray Panthaki as Rak Sharma
Madhur Jaffrey as herself
Ravi Morjaria as himself

Production
The co-writer, director and producers of Resistance brought their team to Leicester, UK, to shoot Jadoo. Amara Karan plays Shalini. Oscar-nominated cinematographer Roger Pratt (The End of the Affair) has returned to his hometown to shoot the film. Eddie Hamilton edited Jadoo.

Reception
Jadoo was not warmly received by David Gritten of The Daily Telegraph; he concluded that it was "dreadfully predictable". Roger Pratt was praised, the film being described as "ravishingly photographed".

References

HeyUGuys (31 July 2013). "Exclusive: New Poster for British-Asian Comedy Jadoo". Retrieved 17 August 2013.
Pukaar News (16 April 2013). "Exclusive interview with Jadoo writer & director". Retrieved 17 August 2013.

External links

2013 films
British comedy films
Films about food and drink
Films scored by Stephen Warbeck
2010s English-language films
2010s British films